Qin Empire or Qin dynasty (221–206 BC), was the first empire in Chinese history.

Qin Empire may also refer to:

The Qin Empire (TV series), a 2009 Chinese TV series
The Qin Empire II: Alliance, a 2012 Chinese TV series
The Qin Empire III, a 2017 Chinese TV series
, a 2020 Chinese TV series